Chief Scientific Adviser may refer to:

 Chief Science Advisor (Canada)
 Chief Scientific Adviser to the Ministry of Defence, United Kingdom
 Government Chief Scientific Adviser (United Kingdom)
 Office of the Chief Scientist (Australia)
 Government Chief Scientific Adviser (Ireland)
 Principal Scientific Adviser to the Government of India
 Science Advisor to the President, of the United States
 , for the European Commission

See also
 Science advice
 Office of the Chief Scientist (disambiguation)